Martina Dominici (born 3 January 2002) is an Argentine artistic gymnast. As a junior, she was the first non-European and the first Argentinian gymnast to win the TopGym, a famous junior competition held in Belgium. A senior gymnast since 2018, she has represented Argentina at the 2018 and 2019 World Championships as well as the 2019 Pan American Games. She is currently suspended for 3 years after testing positive for a banned substance in the 2021 Pan American Gymnastics Championships

Dominici qualified to represent Argentina at the 2020 Summer Olympics in women's artistic gymnastics.  On 23 June 2021, it was reported that Dominici had tested positive for a banned substance, which resulted in her exclusion from the 2020 Summer Olympics. She accepted a three-year period of ineligibility that began on 21 June 2021.

References

External links 
 

2002 births
Living people
Argentine female artistic gymnasts
South American Games gold medalists for Argentina
South American Games silver medalists for Argentina
South American Games bronze medalists for Argentina
South American Games medalists in gymnastics
Gymnasts at the 2019 Pan American Games
Pan American Games competitors for Argentina
Doping cases in gymnastics
Sportspeople from Buenos Aires
Competitors at the 2018 South American Games
21st-century Argentine women